Bellerive may refer to:

 Bellerive, Missouri, a suburb of St. Louis, United States
 Bellerive, Switzerland, municipality in the district of Avenches in the canton of Vaud
 Collonge-Bellerive, Switzerland, a municipality in the canton of Geneva
 Bellerive, Tasmania, Australia, a suburb of the City of Clarence, part of the greater Hobart area

See also
Belle Rive (disambiguation)